P-22 ( – December 17, 2022) was a wild mountain lion who resided in Griffith Park in Los Angeles, California, on the eastern side of the Santa Monica Mountains. P-22 was first identified in 2012 and was the subject of significant media attention, including numerous books, television programs and other works of art. P-22 was often recorded prowling in the Hollywood Hills neighborhood of Los Angeles. He was monitored by a radio collar. P-22 remained in Griffith Park for ten years until he was captured on December 12, 2022. He was then euthanized on December 17, 2022, after examinations revealed he was suffering from traumatic injuries consistent with being hit by a car, in combination with several longer-term health issues.

Early life 
P-22 was born circa 2010 in the western part of the Santa Monica Mountains to P-001 and an unknown female lion. Sometime before 2012, P-22 headed east within the Santa Monica Mountains to Griffith Park, where he settled after crossing two major Los Angeles freeways (Interstate 405 and Route 101). His success in evading traffic on these major routes was highlighted, since multiple mountain lions have died after being struck by vehicles on Los Angeles freeways. The exact route for P-22's journey is unknown.

In Los Angeles 

The U.S. National Park Service noted that P-22's  is too small for an adult cat by a factor of 31 and that it was unlikely he would ever find a mate there. It’s the smallest ever recorded range for an adult male mountain lion.

P-22 primarily resided in Griffith Park but was spotted by Angelenos throughout the Los Angeles neighborhoods of the Hollywood Hills, Los Feliz, and Silver Lake.

2012 discovery
The Griffith Park Connectivity Study, funded by Friends of Griffith Park, was launched in mid-2011. FoGP entered a study agreement and purchased thirteen wildlife cameras. The study objective was to evaluate the movement of large and medium-sized mammals to and from Griffith Park and the surrounding open space. It was the first project of its kind in the Griffith Park region targeting potential corridors. The study was expanded further in 2013, to include tunnels to the LA River and other passages.

The study was led by Daniel S. Cooper. The project was also supported by Erin Boydston of USGS Western Ecological Research Center. Miguel Ordeñana joined as field biologist. The three ecologists, Cooper, Boydston, and Ordeñana, soon began to document deer, bobcats and coyotes crossing via one of the overpass bridges of the Hollywood Freeway in Cahuenga Pass. Ordeñana, poring over hundreds of motion-triggered photos, saw the first camera image taken on February 12, 2012 of the hind quarters of a male mountain lion on a rugged ridgeline just above Ford Theatre. The team released a Study Update in March 2012.

Jeff Sikich lead the mission to catch him. He was first caught in March of 2012. He was fitted with an electronic neck collar that recorded his location over time. He was designated P-22. P is short for "puma" and 22 refers to him being the 22nd puma in the ongoing puma study.

2013 National Geographic photos 
National Geographic photographer Steve Winter worked with Jeff Sikich, a wildlife biologist with the National Park Service, to photograph P-22. He spent 15 months putting up camera traps in Griffith Park, and getting his cameras stolen, before capturing the now-famous photo of P-22 under the Hollywood Sign. This image appeared in the December 2013 issue of National Geographic.

2014 health issues 

In 2014, the National Park Service reported that P-22 had contracted mange stemming from exposure to anti-blood-clotting rat poison. The Park Service gave P-22 topical medications, as well as injections of vitamin K, in efforts to treat him before releasing him back into Griffith Park. The mange eventually subsided and P-22's health improved. The National Park Service again captured P-22 in December 2015 and found he had fully recovered, gaining 15 pounds.

2016 koala killing 
In 2016, the Los Angeles Zoo reported the disappearance of an elderly koala named Killarney, whose carcass was found outside of the koala enclosure. Surveillance footage from the zoo showed P-22 (then seven years old) nearby on zoo grounds, although neither the GPS-tracking data nor camera footage recorded an actual interaction between the two animals. Los Angeles City Council member Mitch O'Farrell called for investigating the relocation of P-22 after the incident. The National Park Service called the koala killing "normal predatory behavior", and the Zoo declined to ask for a depredation permit for P-22, instead opting for more secure enclosure methods for some of its animals at night.

Capture and death 
The National Park Service and the California Department of Fish and Wildlife announced in December 2022 that they would capture P-22 to evaluate his health, following a pair of attacks on chihuahuas in the city. Changes in his behavior had also been noticed including appearing to be agitated and venturing farther from his usual range. On December 12, he was located in a Los Feliz homeowner's backyard and tranquilized by the California Department of Fish and Wildlife. He was first triaged at the Los Angeles Zoo, and then taken to the San Diego Zoo Wildlife Alliance. Officials initially said he was in stable condition and were considering all options, including releasing P-22 back into the wild or keeping him in a wildlife sanctuary, but that euthanasia was off the table unless P-22 was determined to be suffering from a "really serious" health condition.

The next day, officials announced that P-22 would likely not be released back into Griffith Park, and that his health had deteriorated. According to the Department of Fish and Wildlife and the Park Service, he was found to be significantly underweight, with thinning fur, possible mange, and damage to his right eye, possibly from a vehicle—a vehicle collision with a mountain lion had been reported the night of December 11, and P-22's radio collar data supported the idea that he had been the mountain lion involved. Officials said P-22 would undergo further medical evaluations before a decision was made.

He was examined by a team of doctors at the San Diego Zoo Safari Park which revealed serious health issues. His injuries included skull fractures, injuries to his right eye, skin injuries, and herniation of abdominal organs into his chest. In addition to those health issues, P-22 was found to be suffering from multiple longer-term medical problems, including stage 2 kidney failure, heart disease, a parasitic skin infection of Demodex gatoi, and weight loss (weighing , when he was typically at ).  On December 17, at 9:00 a.m., P-22 was euthanized.

Burial 
More than a year prior to P-22's actual death, Miguel Ordeñana applied for the Natural History Museum — in the event of P-22's death — to receive his remains for research purposes, and thought that P-22 would be put on display at the museum.

After a necropsy, P-22 was transported from San Diego to the Natural History Museum of Los Angeles County. A blessing ceremony was held by museum officials and descendants from Gabrieleño/Tongva, Tataviam, and Chumash, Gabrielino-Shoshone, Akimel O'otham, and Luiseño Tribes to "welcome P-22 back to his homeland”. Native American tribes in Southern California call mountain lions teachers and would like P-22 to be buried near Griffith Park with a ceremony that honors his spirit. The museum does not plan to taxidermy his body or put his remains on display. His remains were stored in a freezer at the museum. He was buried in early March in the Santa Monica Mountains at an undisclosed location in collaboration with local Indigenous partners, the California Department of Fish and Wildlife, the Natural History Museum and the National Park Service.

Legacy and tributes 

Numerous members of the community and public figures released statements or condolences shortly following news of his death, including Governor of California Gavin Newsom, U.S. representative Adam Schiff, California State Representative Laura Friedman, and Los Angeles City Councilmember Nithya Raman, among many others. In his statement, Newsom said that "P-22's survival on an island of wilderness in the heart of Los Angeles captivated people around the world and revitalized efforts to protect our diverse native species and ecosystems." The Greek Theatre in Griffith Park is the site of a celebration of the life of P-22, presented by National Wildlife Federation on February 4, 2023.

In 2016, Beth Pratt, a California regional executive director for the National Wildlife Federation helped establish the #SaveLACougars campaign and held the first celebration of P-22 Day. The Natural History Museum of Los Angeles County has an exhibit about him.

Since first being spotted in Los Angeles, P-22 became the subject of multiple books, television programs, and works of art. More broadly, the image of P-22 has risen to use as a symbol representing Los Angeles culture and wildlife conservation both in California and more generally. Articles commemorating P-22 before and after his death noted the challenges the mountain lion faced. The Los Angeles Times obituary for P-22 called him "an aging bachelor who adjusted to a too-small space in the big city," and described his border-crossing journey to Griffith Park as something that many Los Angeles residents could empathize with.

The Los Angeles Public Library issued a limited-edition library card featuring P-22 in the National Geographic photo with the Hollywood Sign in the background.

In February 2023, Southern California U.S. representatives Adam Schiff, Julia Brownley, and Ted Lieu wrote a letter to the Citizens' Stamp Advisory Committee nominating P-22 to appear on a future stamp design.

Wallis Annenberg Wildlife Crossing
P-22 became the poster puma for the promotion of the Wallis Annenberg Wildlife Crossing. In order to get to Griffith Park, P-22 had to cross two freeways, the 101 and the 405. While he survived his crossings, many pumas do not. The wildlife crossing over the 101 freeway was proposed in 2015. The funds were raised, and the project broke ground in April 2022.

Murals
Multiple murals around the city prominently feature P-22. Muralist Jonathan Martinez painted three: one in Watts, one at Esperanza Elementary School in Westlake, and another at Ladera STARS Academy in Thousand Oaks. In 2022, artist Corie Mattie painted two murals, in Silver Lake as a part of the #SaveLACougars campaign, and another in Fairfax following his death.

In popular culture

Books

Film and television 

P-22's highway journey was parodied in an easter egg in season 4 episode 6 of the television show Bojack Horseman. He was also featured in a clue on the game show Jeopardy! in 2022. P-22 was mentioned in the Hulu original series, This Fool. When the main character Julio Lopez is taken for an unwanted hiking trip by his ex-girlfriend Maggie, he worries that they will be devoured by P-22. The mountain lion later appears instead to menace a happy couple who has just gotten engaged.

Playwright Amy Raasch portrays P-22 in her recurring one-woman stage production The Animal Monologues.

See also 
 Fauna of the Santa Monica Mountains
 Cougar–human interactions
 Foss, the pet cat of Edward Lear

Notes

References

External links 

 P-22's Decade in Griffith Park – Friends of Griffith Park
 
 

21st-century animal births
2022 animal deaths
Environment of Greater Los Angeles
Fauna of the California chaparral and woodlands
Griffith Park
Individual felines
Individual wild animals
Lions in art
Cougar
Santa Monica Mountains
Individual animals in the United States